Pechora Sea (or Pechorskoye More), is a sea at the northwest of Russia, the southeastern part of the Barents Sea. The western border of the sea is off Kolguyev Island, while the eastern border is the western coasts of Vaygach Island and the Yugorsky Peninsula, and the northern border the southern end of Novaya Zemlya.

The Pechora Sea is quite shallow, its average depth being only 6 m. The deepest point reaches 210 m. In the southern part of the sea runs the eastward-flowing Kolguyev Current. There are a few islands close to the coast, the largest of which is Dolgiy Island.

The Pechora Sea is blocked by floating ice from November to June. The main river entering the sea is the Pechora.

History
Historically, before the adjacent Barents Sea was named as such, the Pechora Sea's own name was already established. The rest of the present-day Barents Sea was known then as "Sea of Murmansk" (Murmanskoye Morye).

The Pechora Sea was used as a starting point of the exploration of the hitherto unknown icy seas lying to the east. The earliest recorded voyage across the Pechora Sea through the Yugorsky Strait was made by early Russian explorer Uleb, from Nizhny Novgorod. Uleb's passing into the Kara Sea was recorded in 1032.

Russian "Pomors", the coastal dwellers of the White Sea shores, explored this sea and the coast of Novaya Zemlya since the 11th century. The Arctic's first shipping line, the Great Mangazea Route, from the White Sea to the Ob River and the Yenisei Gulf began operating in the latter part of the 16th century. This line opened up the way to Siberia's riches and it worked until 1619, when it was closed for military and political reasons, for fear of possible penetration by Europeans into Siberia.

Ecology
The fisheries of the Barents Sea, in particular the cod fisheries, are of great importance for both Norway and Russia. There is a diversity of benthic fauna on the Pechora Sea floor. In addition, there is a genetically distinct polar bear population associated with the Barents Sea. So called Karskaya group of beluga whales migrate into Pechora Sea for wintering. Various species such as walruses are under threat of possible pollutions.

In current times there is some oil drilling in the Pechora Sea at the Dolginskoye and Prirazlomnoye oil fields. The negative ecological impact of such industrial exploitation in the Pechora Sea coast is significant. According to Greenpeace and the World Wildlife Fund Gasprom is not prepared to deal adequately with a spill associated with oil production. As such, in September, 2013, Greenpeace staged a confrontation with the Russian Coast Guard in which Greenpeace activists approached and attempted to scale a Gasprom drilling platform.

References
 Encyclopædia Britannica
 Salve Dahle (2004) Benthic fauna in the Pechora Sea.  In: Oslo Database. Norwegian Polar Institute; Polar Environmental Centre; Akvaplan-niva, Tromsø, Norway, 10 September 2004 
 Benthic fauna: 
 C. Michael Hogan (2008) Polar Bear: Ursus maritimus, Globaltwitcher.com, ed. Nicklas Stromberg
 Oil and Gas Resources in North-West Russia (2008) 
 S. A. Ogorodov (2004) Human impact on coastal stability in the Pechora Sea 
 Leonid Sverdlov, (Member of the Russian Geographic Society), RUSSIAN NAVAL OFFICERS AND GEOGRAPHIC EXPLORATION IN NORTHERN RUSSIA.
 C. Raymond Beazley, The Russian Expansion Towards Asia and the Arctic in the Middle Ages (to 1500). The American Historical Review

Line notes

Seas of the Arctic Ocean
Bodies of water of the Barents Sea
Bodies of water of Nenets Autonomous Okrug
Seas of Russia